Hrvatsko Zagorje (Croatian Zagorje; zagorje is Croatian for "backland" or "behind the hills") is a cultural region in northern Croatia, traditionally separated from the country's capital Zagreb by the Medvednica Mountain. It comprises the whole area north of Mount Medvednica up to Slovenia in the north and west, and up to the regions of Međimurje and Podravina in the north and east. The population of Zagorje is not recorded as such, as it is administratively divided among Krapina-Zagorje County (total population 142,432), and western and central part of Varaždin County (total population 183,730). The population of Zagorje can be reasonably estimated to exceed 300,000 people.

In Croatia, the area is usually referred to simply as Zagorje (Croatian for "backland" or "behind the hills"; with respect to Medvednica). However, to avoid confusion with the nearby municipality of Zagorje ob Savi in Slovenia, the Croatian part is called Hrvatsko zagorje, meaning "Croatian Zagorje".

The town of Krapina is often referred to as the cultural capital of Kajkavian dialect (Croatian: Kajkavščina), the South Slavic regiolect spoken in north-western Croatia. Every year, the Festival of Kajkavian Song takes place in Krapina.

Towns and Villages
2011 Census:
 Zaprešić (25.495 people)
 Ivanec (13,758 people)
 Krapina (12,480 people)
 Zabok (8,994 people)
 Lepoglava (8,283 people)
 Bedekovčina (8,041 people)
 Pregrada (6,594 people)
 Sveti Križ Začretje (6,165 people)
 Oroslavje (6,138 people)
 Zlatar (6,096 people)
 Marija Bistrica (5,976 people)
 Donja Stubica (5,680 people)
 Krapinske Toplice (5,367 people)
 Gornja Stubica (5,284 people)
 Hum na Sutli (5,060 people)
 Veliko Trgovišće (4,945 people)
 Bednja (3,992 people)
 Jakovlje (3,930 people)
 Konjščina (3,790 people)
 Klanjec (2,915 people)

See also
 Geography of Croatia
 Zakarpattia and Záhorie (both contain similar geographic concepts)

References

Zagorje
Historical regions in Croatia